WWIS (1260 AM) is a radio station  broadcasting a full-service adult contemporary music format. Licensed to Black River Falls, Wisconsin, United States.  The station is currently owned by WWIS Radio, Inc. and features programming from CBS News Radio.

In 2007, WWIS music director Brian Brawner was recognized as the Adult Contemporary Music Director of the Year by the New Music Awards.

References

External links

WIS
Mainstream adult contemporary radio stations in the United States
Radio stations established in 1958
1958 establishments in Wisconsin
WIS